Amphimedon massalis is a species of sponge in the family Niphatidae. The body of the sponge consists of silica needles and sponge fibres and is capable of taking in much water. It is distributed in Port Phillip Bay, south of Victoria, Australia.

References

Haplosclerina
Sponges described in 1886